Ctenisolabis montana is a species of earwig in the family Brachylabinae. It is found in the Indomalayan, Palaearctic, and Afrotropical realms.

References

External links
 species Ctenisolabis montana (Borelli, 1909) at Dermaptera Species File

Anisolabididae
Insects of Africa
Insects of Asia
Beetles described in 1909